Juho Valerian Kekkonen (31 August 1890, Heinolan maalaiskunta - 13 September 1951) was a Finnish schoolteacher and politician. He was a member of the Parliament of Finland from 1919 to 1922, representing the Christian Workers' Union of Finland (SKrTL).

References

1890 births
1951 deaths
People from Heinola
People from Mikkeli Province (Grand Duchy of Finland)
Christian Workers' Union of Finland politicians
Members of the Parliament of Finland (1919–22)
Finnish schoolteachers